Ravarino is a comune (municipality) in the Province of Modena in the Italian region Emilia-Romagna, located about  northwest of Bologna and about  northeast of Modena.  
 
Ravarino borders the following municipalities: Bomporto, Camposanto, Crevalcore, Nonantola.

References

External links
 Official website

Cities and towns in Emilia-Romagna